Laadla is a village in Saaremaa Parish, Saare County, Estonia, on the island of Saaremaa. It has a population of 34.

References

Villages in Saare County